Penny Bridge may refer to:

Penny Bridge, Cumbria, a village in England
Penny Bridge station, a railway station in New York